The 2013–14 season are the Esteghlal Football Club's 13th season in the Iran Pro League, and their 20th consecutive season in the top division of Iranian football. They are also competing in the Hazfi Cup and AFC Champions League, and 69th year in existence as a football club.

Club

Kit 

|
|
|
|}

Coaching staff

Other personnel

Grounds

Player

First team squad
Last updated: 1 February 2014

Iran Pro League squad

 

 U21 = Under 21 Player
 U23 = Under 23 Player
Source: 2013–14 Pro League squad

ACL 2013 squad

 

Source: 2013 ACL squad

ACL 2014 squad

Transfers

Summer 

In:

Out:

Winter 

In:

Out:

Competitions

Overall

Note: Current Position/Round Only use for team still a part of Competition.

Competition record

Iran Pro League

Standings

Results summary

Results by round

Matches

Last updated: 14 February 2014

Hazfi Cup 

Last updated: 14 February 2014

2013 AFC Champions League

Knock-out stage

Quarter-finals

Semi-finals 

Last updated: 14 February 2014

2014 AFC Champions League

Group stage 

Source: Matches
Last updated: 14 February 2014

Friendlies

Pre-season

During season

Statistics

Appearances and goals 

|-
! colspan="12" style="background:#dcdcdc; text-align:center;"| Goalkeepers

|-
! colspan="12" style="background:#dcdcdc; text-align:center;"| Defenders

|-
! colspan="12" style="background:#dcdcdc; text-align:center;"| Midfielders

|-
! colspan="12" style="background:#dcdcdc; text-align:center;"| Strikers

|-
|colspan="14"|Players sold or loaned out or retired after the start of the season:

|}

Disciplinary record
Includes all competitive matches. Players with 1 card or more included only.

Last updated on 06 December 2013

Goals conceded 
 05 Dec 2013

Overall statistics
{|class="wikitable" style="text-align: center;"
|-
!
!Total
! Home
! Away
! Neutral
|-
|align=left| Games played || 31 || 16 || 17 || N/A
|-
|align=left| Games won || 18 || 10 || 8 || N/A
|-
|align=left| Games drawn || 10 || 5 || 5 || N/A
|-
|align=left| Games lost || 5 || 1 || 4 || N/A
|-
|align=left| Biggest win || 4-2Fajr Sepasi F.C. || N/A || N/A || N/A
|-
|align=left| Biggest loss || 4-2Malavan F.C. || N/A || N/A || N/A
|-
|align=left| Biggest win (League) || N/A || N/A || N/A || N/A
|-
|align=left| Biggest win (Cup) || N/A || N/A || N/A || N/A
|-
|align=left| Biggest win (Asia) || N/A || N/A || N/A || N/A
|-
|align=left| Biggest loss (League) || N/A || N/A || N/A || N/A
|-
|align=left| Biggest loss (Cup) || N/A || N/A || N/A || N/A
|-
|align=left| Biggest loss (Asia) || N/A || N/A || N/A || N/A
|-
|align=left| Clean sheets || 14 || 9 || 5 || N/A
|-
|align=left| Goals scored || 37 || 19 || 18|| N/A
|-
|align=left| Goals conceded || 22 || 7 || 15 || N/A
|-
|align=left| Goal difference || +18 || +12 || +3 || N/A
|-
|-
|-
|align=left| Points || N/A || N/A || N/A || N/A
|-
|align=left| Winning rate || N/A || N/A || N/A || N/A
|-
|align=left| Most appearances ||28: Mehdi Rahmati || align=left colspan=3| N/A
|-
|align=left| Most minutes played || 2520 min || align=left colspan=3| N/A
|-
|align=left| Top scorer || Mohammad Ghazi || align=left colspan=3|N/A
|-
|align=left| Top assister || N/A || align=left colspan=3| N/A
|-

Awards

Player

See also
 2013–14 Iran Pro League
 2013–14 Hazfi Cup
 2013 AFC Champions League
 2014 AFC Champions League

References

External links
 Iran Premier League Statistics
 Persian League

Esteghlal F.C. seasons
Esteghlal